The FIA Junior WRC, also known as JWRC and previously known as Junior World Rally Championship, is an international rallying competition restricted to drivers under 29 years old. The championship currently consists of five select rallies of the FIA World Rally Championship (WRC) calendar. The category has been a stepping stone in the careers of WRC Champion Sébastien Ogier, Dani Sordo, Elfyn Evans and Thierry Neuville.

Junior WRC differs from the WRC support championships, WRC2 and WRC3, as the competition is managed and promoted by M-Sport Poland under contract to the FIA. All cars are identical, provided and serviced by M-Sport on the entrants' behalf. The car used in 2022 was a Ford Fiesta Rally3. Championship titles are awarded to the winning Driver and Co-Driver.

The FIA did not award Junior WRC champion titles in the 2022 season. Instead, the titles of FIA WRC3 Junior were awarded to the winners of the Junior WRC competition run by M-Sport.

History
The championship's origins began in 2001 as the FIA Super 1600 Drivers' Championship, and included six events in Europe. Sébastien Loeb was the series' champion, driving a Super 1600 Citroën Saxo. The series became the Junior World Rally Championship the following year, with an upper age limit of 29 introduced in 2003.

In 2007, the championship did not include events outside Europe. Following introduction of a rule in 2006 surrounding use of the word 'world' in championships, the championship was known as the FIA Junior Rally Championship (JRC) for one season only. The 2010 season was the last Junior World Rally Championship.

In 2011, the FIA replaced the championship with the WRC Academy Cup and it did not award FIA titles. This was the first year the championship was managed under contract. M-Sport provided identical Ford Fiesta R2 cars to entrants to use. In 2013 the series was renamed to FIA Junior WRC.

In 2014, Citroën were awarded the contract to run Junior WRC providing Citroën DS3 R3T cars. M-Sport repurposed the old Ford Fiesta R2 units for the Drive DMACK Fiesta Trophy. 

In 2017, M-Sport regained the running rights continuing to use the Ford Fiesta R2. Following the introduction of the Rally Pyramid in 2019, the latest evolution Ford Fiesta Rally4 was introduced for the second round of the 2020 season.

At the 2018 season the number of rallies were reduced to 5, while the last rally gives double points.

In March 2021 the FIA announced there will not be any two-wheel drive championships in WRC from 2022. It was later announced Rally3 cars would be used for Junior WRC from then on. The FIA title for 2022 was called WRC3 Junior, however for 2023, FIA Junior WRC will be restored.

Rules
The Junior WRC is open to drivers under the age of 29 who have not competed as a Priority 1 (P1) driver in an FIA World Rally Championship event. Competitors drive identical Ford Fiesta Rally4 cars using Pirelli tyres. There is no obligation to enter a minimum number of rounds and all rounds contribute to the championship points tally.

The point-scoring system based on classification is the same as in the WRC, WRC2 and WRC3 championships, with points allocated to the top ten classified finishers as follows:

The last rally in the season awards double classification points to competitors who have started at least 3 previous rounds. Power Stage points are not awarded in Junior WRC as in the other WRC championships, however JWRC competitors can score one championship bonus point for each stage win during the season.

The Nations Trophy sums points of the best performing driver from each nation each round, not including stage points.

Results

Drivers' Championship

Statistics
Updated after the 2022 season.

Championships by driver's country

Championships by manufacturer

Round wins by driver

Round wins by manufacturer

Gallery

See also 
WRC2
WRC3
Production World Rally Championship
Super 2000 World Rally Championship

References

General Statistics 
ewrc-Results.com

juwra.com Independent WRC archive

Notes

External links
 Junior WRC at WRC.com

Junior
Rally racing series
Recurring sporting events established in 2001